Svetla Bozhkova Gyuleva (born March 13, 1951, in Yambol) is a retired female discus thrower, who competed for Bulgaria at two Summer Olympics: 1972 and 1980. A member of Tundzha Yambol and Levski-Spartak Club, she set her personal best (67.26 metres) in 1980.

References
sports-reference

1951 births
Living people
Bulgarian female discus throwers
Athletes (track and field) at the 1972 Summer Olympics
Athletes (track and field) at the 1980 Summer Olympics
Olympic athletes of Bulgaria
People from Yambol